The History of a Town (post-reform ) is a 1870 novel by Mikhail Saltykov-Shchedrin. The plot presents the history of the town of Glupov (can be translated Foolsville), a grotesque microcosm of the Russian Empire. Written in the Era of the Great Reforms in the 19th century, it was neglected for a long time and rediscovered only in the 20th century. It is regarded by critics as the author's masterpiece and sometimes even compared to Gabriel García Márquez's One Hundred Years of Solitude.

Background
In the 1867-1868 Saltykov-Shchedrin stopped working upon the cycle of satirical sketches The Pompadours and started upon the novel, seeing it a kind of a spin-off for the cycle. In January 1869 the two first chapters appeared in the Otechestvennye Zapiski magazine. A pause followed and lasted till the end of the year: the author wrote and published several satirical fairytales (such as "The Story of How a Muzhik fed two generals") and satirical sketches. The rest of the novel was published in issues in 1870. The last chapter of the novel, which describes the rule of Ugryum-Burcheev, was impressed by the murder of Ivan Ivanov by the socialist revolutionary group "People's Vengeance".

Plot 
The novel presents a fictional chronicle (letopis) of a provincial Russian town of Glupov (the name can be translated as Foolsville, Foolov, or Stupidtown), which depicts Glupov and its governors from its foundation by the tribe of Headbeaters to its end in 1825 (the accession of Nicholas I). Among the governors of Glupov are Dementy Brudasty, nicknamed The Music Box for a mechanical device in his head, designed to replace a human brain; Vasilisk Borodavkin, who wages 'the wars of enlightenment' against the Glupovites; Erast Grustilov, a friend of Nikolay Karamzin. All of them are trying to bring prosperity to Glupov or to keep their status by ruling the town in their own way, mostly by violence. The last governor of Glupov is Ugryum-Burcheev, who  rebuilds the town into a totalitarian state according the administrative ideal of Russian Empire and to his utopia of a 'straight line', intended to make everyone equal. His rule results with the coming of "it", which destroys Glupov, making the history "to cease its course".

Reception and significance 

Although Turgenev received the novel well, it has generated controversy short after its appearance, as most of the critics couldn't understand Saltykov's idea of placating the present while seeming to depict the past, and considered it as a parody of Russian history, in which the town stands for Russia, and the governors are caricatures on Russian sovereigns and their ministers. After the heated polemics and discussions on whether or not the novel was something more than just a caricature of the Russian state and the House of Romanov, or even on the Russian past, it was neglected for several decades, until it was rediscovered in the 20th century by the Soviet propagandists, who gave an impetus to a serious study of Saltykov's work, which, however, lacked in objectivity and assertion of significance of the novel beyond the historically ramified period which it ostensibly covered. After the interest to the chronicle increased in the 20th century, it survived various interpretations, and it was later noted, that Saltykov attacks the "situation" in which the helpless and passive masses obey to the 'governors', the bearers of the power and exclusivity; that he conveys his ideas of history and the role in which the people play in it through such satirical devices such as the grotesque and "laughter through tears"; that the author in his satire of Utopia in his description of Ugryum-Burcheev's rule predicted the totalitarian regimes of the 20th century and anticipated the famous dystopias such as the Nineteen Eighty-Four by George Orwell and We by Yevgeny Zamyatin.

Style 
Because of his grotesque satire and fantasy, Saltykov is often compared to Nikolai Gogol. He is also similar with his semantic manipulation. However, Saltykov is different with his 'grim single-mindedness', which is seen in uncharacteristic of Gogol crude and some times erotic (for example, the town-governesses 'ate babies, cut off women’s breasts and ate them too') scenes of violence, death and "repression for repression's sake". Virginia Llewellyn Smith notes: "Unlike Gogol, Saltykov never gives the impression that he himself scarcely distinguished fantasy from reality, and one result is that his narrative has moments of genuine pathos." 

In The History of a Town, a parody of Russian chronicles, Saltykov satirizes the style of official documents and chronicles. For example, the scene of Headbeaters drowning in a bog is commented with a phrase 'Many showed zeal for their native land.' He also conveys an impression of insecurity by shifting between from one style to another: the scenes of violence are often written by a style of a realist novel, but then Saltykov reverts to 'the chronicler’s unctuous tones'; harsh realism is changed with fantasy.

Screen adaptations 
Organchik (1933), directed by Nikolai Khodataev.
Ono (1989), directed by Sergei Ovcharov.
Istoriya odnogo goroda. Organchik (1991), directed by Valentin Karavaev.
Khroniki odnogo mista (2017), directed by Yevgen Syvokin', Ukraine.

English editions 
The History of a Town, Willem A. Meeuws, Oxford, 1980. Translated by I. P. Foote 
The History of a Town, or, The Chronicle of Foolov, Ardis, 1982. 
The History of a Town, translated and annotated by I. P. Foote, foreword by Charlotte Hobson. Head of Zeus, 2016.

References 

1870 Russian novels
Novels by Mikhail Saltykov-Shchedrin
Russian satirical novels
Russian political satire
Russian political novels
Novels about totalitarianism
Dystopian novels
Russian novels adapted into films
Works originally published in Otechestvennye Zapiski